District Rural Development Agency (DRDA) has traditionally been the principal organ at the district level to oversee the implementation of anti-poverty programmes of the Ministry of Rural Development. This agency was originally created to implement the Integrated Rural Development Programme (IRDP). Subsequently, the DRDAs were entrusted with a number of programmes of both state and central governments. The task of DRDA has been to identify the needs of the rural population and reach the appropriate schemes where they are needed. In implementing the schemes, the role of the DRDA has been technical, managerial and financial. Thus, DRDA is not only a body to disburse the funds for the schemes but also provides appropriate managerial and technical support.

The governing body of DRDA includes Members of Parliament (MPs), Members of Legislative Assemblies (MLAs), District level officials of Development Departments, Bankers, NGOs and representatives of weaker sections of the society. The Governing body at the district level provides guidance and directions to DRDA.

From April 1999 a separate DRDA Administration has been introduced to take care of the administrative costs. This aims at strengthening the DRDAs and make them more professional in managing the anti-poverty programmes and be an effective link between the ministry and the district level.

Rural development and poverty alleviation programmes are implemented on a decentralised basis, keeping in view the large geographical areas, the administrative requirements and the need to involve grassroots-level officials and the community in the implementation of the programmes. At the central level, the Ministry of Rural Areas & Employment has been implementing these programmes. The Ministry is responsible for the release of the central share of funds, policy formulation, overall guidance, monitoring and evaluation of the programmes. At the State level, the Principal Secretary, Rural Development and the Commissioner of Rural Development are overall in-charge of the implementation of the rural development programmes. At the District level, the programmes are implemented through the DRDAs (District Rural Development Agencies).

Context of decentralization 
With the adoption of the Constitutional mandate for decentralization of powers that privileged those self-government institutions in planning for economic development and social justice, the proposal to re-think the status of DRDAs and also to merge them with the panchayats had emerged. Under the section on 'devolution of functionaries' the 1st Round Table had adopted a resolution, number IV(i), for reconceiving the role of District Rural Development Agencies (DRDAs). DRDAs were to be progressively merged with the District Panchayats and their technical expertise was made available to all tiers of Panchayats.

At an all India level, the progress reported in this regard is far from satisfactory. There are some vexed issues, one among which is the 'reported' reluctance on the part of some of the institutions of the Union Government for the proposal of merger of DRDAs with the district Panchayats. The complete merger seems to have happened only in Kerala and Karnataka. The latter has a much longer history of doing this. In both the States the DRDAs function as if they were the cells for poverty alleviation/ rural development schemes within the Zilla Panchayats.

West Bengal is reported to have taken similar steps; yet, it does not measure up to the yardstick of a complete merger. Rajasthan and Lakshadweep State/ UT Profile make a similar assertion; this report is unable to confirm this.

Status of DRDAs in the States
In 10 States/ UTs the DRDAs continue to be separate with the only linkage established with the ZPs is making the president of ZP the chairperson of the DRDA. These are Bihar, Chhattisgarh, Himachal Pradesh, Madhya Pradesh, Odisha, Punjab, Tripura, Uttar Pradesh, Uttarakhand, and Lakshadweep. In Gujarat the district development officer, who is also the chief executive officer of the Zilla Panchayat, continues to chair the DRDA. In nine states/ UTs either the collector continues as the chair or some other arrangement has been made in this regard. These are Assam, Goa, Haryana, Jharkhand, Manipur, Tamil Nadu, Dadra & Nagar Haveli, Daman & Diu, and Pondicherry. Andhra Pradesh has made the Zilla Panchayat president the chair of the DRDA while designating the collector as the executive chairperson. Similarly, in Maharashtra,
while the President Zilla Panchayat is made the chair of the DRDA, the chief executive officer of the Zilla Panchayat is designated as the executive chairman of the management committee.

References

External links
 state of panchayats : 2007-08 , An independent assessment, Volume I : Thematic reports
 Rural Development Schemes in India

See also
 Rural development
 integrated Rural Development Programme

Local government in India
Decentralization